John D. Smith is a former professor of Sanskrit at Cambridge.

John D. Smith may also refer to:

 John David Smith (1786–1849), Canadian politician
 John Derek Smith (1924–2003), British biologist
 John Donnell Smith (1829–1928), American biologist
 John Douglas Smith (born 1966), Canadian sound editor
 John Donald Smith (1919–1997), Canadian politician in the Legislative Assembly of British Columbia
 John Derby Smith (1812–1884), minister, physician, and Massachusetts state legislator